The following is a list of the highest-income ZCTAs in the United States. ZCTAs or ZIP Code Tabulation Areas are the census equivalent of ZIP codes used for statistical purposes. The reason why regular ZIP codes are not used is because they are defined by routes rather than geographic boundaries. Thus, they have the tendency to overlap and otherwise create difficulties. Note that ZIP Code Tabulations are not exact, they are only near approximations.

ZCTAs ranked by median household income

ZCTAs with median household incomes in excess of $150,000

ZCTAs ranked by per capita income

References 

United States demography-related lists
Income in the United States
ZIP code